Ryzhkovo is the name of several inhabited localities in Russia. It may refer to:

Ryzhkovo, Kursk Oblast
Ryzhkovo, Omsk Oblast
Ryzhkovo, Perm Krai
Ryzhkovo, Vladimir Oblast
Ryzhkovo, Cherepovetsky District, Vologda Oblast